Edward Henry Clark (1870 – 24 June 1932) was an Independent Member of Parliament for Chalmers, in the South Island of New Zealand. He was a Member of the Legislative Council and for a time was its Chairman of Committees.

Early life
Clark was born in Palmerston, Otago and was a building contractor in Dunedin.

Political career

Edward Clark was on the council of Palmerston. He was Mayor 1904–1910 and 1919–1923.

Clark represented the  electorate in the New Zealand House of Representatives for six years from 1908 to 1914, when he retired.

Clark was an Independent Liberal for all of his parliamentary career.

Clark was a member of the Legislative Council from 25 June 1920 to his death in 1932. He served as Chairman of Committees in 1931 and 1932.

Notes

References

1870 births
1932 deaths
New Zealand Liberal Party MPs
Independent MPs of New Zealand
Members of the New Zealand Legislative Council
Mayors of places in Otago
New Zealand businesspeople
Businesspeople in construction
New Zealand Liberal Party MLCs
New Zealand MPs for Dunedin electorates
Members of the New Zealand House of Representatives
Unsuccessful candidates in the 1905 New Zealand general election